England Hockey is the national governing body for the sport of field hockey in England. There are separate governing bodies for the sport in the other parts of the United Kingdom.

History and organisation
England Hockey was formed on 1 January 2003 to replace the English Hockey Association (EHA) which had had to suspend operations 2002 because of significant financial problems. The English Hockey Association had in turn been formed in 1996 to combine the function of the separate governing bodies for men's, women's and mixed hockey. Following the demise of the EHA, England's international hockey was for a time managed through a separate limited company called World Class Hockey Limited, which was funded entirely by Sport England.  These operations were merged back into England Hockey on 1 July 2005. The second tier of hockey administration in England consists of five regional associations: East, Midlands, North, South and West, and  county associations below.

England Hockey is affiliated to the European Hockey Federation and International Hockey Federation. It runs a number of competitions, including the English Hockey League.

While UK hockey is organised by separate bodies for each of the home nations, the United Kingdom is required to enter a combined team in the Olympics. This has created tensions between the governing bodies and those responsible for the Great Britain teams. However the women's team have been performing well, winning a bronze at the Olympic Games in London 2012 and most recently the gold at the Olympic Games on Rio in 2016.

Current England Squad
The current England Men and England Women Hockey teams train at Bisham Abbey National Sport Centre just outside Marlow.

Clubs
Over 841 clubs across England and the Channel Islands affiliate to England Hockey. The Hockey seasons for clubs are split into the Winter season running from mainly from September to April and the Summer season running from May to August.

New National Hockey Stadium
Following the success in London 2012, the new national stadium for Hockey relocated 500 yards to the Lee Valley Hockey and Tennis centre. The first rate facilities at the £30million Lee Valley Hockey and Tennis Centre include two hockey pitches capable of seating 3,000 and can be scaled up to 15,000 with temporary overlay. Lee Valley has already hosted the European Hockey Championships in 2015 and the Women's Champions Trophy Event in 2016, The Men's World League Round 3 in 2017 and the Hockey Women's World Cup in 2018 will also be staged here.

Until early 2009, England Hockey was based at the former, purpose-built, former England National Hockey Stadium in Milton Keynes, but the cost of running the stadium was one of the factors that led to the demise of the English Hockey Association. The ground was leased to Wimbledon (later Milton Keynes Dons) football club in 2003 and has not been used for hockey since then. On 17 December 2009, demolition of the stadium began, the site is now used for a new national HQ for Network Rail.

Competitions
England Hockey runs a series of senior competitions over the course of a year:

 Leagues 
 Men's England Hockey League
 Women's England Hockey League
 Women's Outdoor
 England Hockey Women's Championship Cup
 Investec Women's Trophy
 Investec Women's Vase
 Women's Second XI Cup
 Women's Second XI Plate
 Men's Outdoor
 England Hockey Men's Championship Cup
 NOW: Pensions Men's Trophy
 NOW: Pensions Men's Vase
 Men's Second XI Cup
 Men's Second XI Plate
 Mixed Outdoor
 Mixed Trophy
 Mixed Plate
 Men's Senior County Championships
 Indoor
 Maxinutrition Hockey 5s Championships

In addition to these, there are also several indoor and outdoor junior competitions for both schools and clubs, as well as masters' competitions for over 45s.

Board of directors
 Chief Executive Officer - Nick Pink
 Commercial Director - Jonathan Cockroft
 Development Director - Richard Beer
 Finance & Administration Director - Ian Wilson
 Performance Director - Ed Barney

See also
Field hockey in Great Britain

References

External links
 Great Britain Hockey 
Main England hockey organisations
Official site for England Hockey
Official site for England Hockey Junior Pages
National Programme Umpires Association

 
National members of the European Hockey Federation
Organisations based in Buckinghamshire
Sports clubs in Berkshire
Sport in Milton Keynes
Hockey
Sports organizations established in 2003
Royal Borough of Windsor and Maidenhead
2003 establishments in England